Sankara Is Not Dead (theatrically as Sankara n'est pas mort) is a 2019 French documentary film directed by Burkinabé filmmaker Lucie Viver and produced by Eugénie Michel-Villette. The film revolves around the young poet Bikontine who starts a journery from South to North after Burkina Faso's October 2014 popular uprising during the reign of former president Thomas Sankara.

In 2021, the film won the Best History Documentary Prize at Benin City Film Festival.

Cast 
 Bikontine as himself

Awards
The film has received critics acclaim and screened in many international film festivals. The film also won many awards.

 Best Documentary Direction in Festival Internacional de Cine Austral
 Special Festival Mention in Tamil Nadu Film Festival 
 MENTION SPÉCIALE DU JURY DOKer Festival International du Film Documentaire 
 SPECIAL MENTION DOKer Moscow International Documentary Film Festival 2020 
 FIRST PRIZE "Breaking boundaries" RHODE ISLAND INTERNATIONAL FILM FESTIVAL 2020 
 Best Documentary Feature Budapest IFF HUNGARY 2019
 SPECIAL JURY PRIZE in African International Film Festival AFRIFF 
 JOHN MARSHALL AWARD for Contemporary Ethnographic Media au Camden IFF, USA
 ENTREVUES DE BELFORT, PRIX FILM EN COURS 2018

References

External links 
 

Burkinabé documentary films
2019 films
2019 documentary films
French documentary films
2010s French films